Nenana Valley is an archaeological site in the Yukon-Koyukuk Census Area of Alaska.

The site was first occupied around 11,000 years ago (early Holocene) and  represents one of the earliest known sites in Arctic North America. The location of artifacts in the stratigraphic column suggests that, originally, the site was not occupied year-round, and that during the last glacial period people would have been travelling back and forth between North America and Asia, using this site as an outpost. Zooarchaeological evidence, such as mammoth and sheep bones, suggest that people were following these paths seasonally for hunting. As the ice age ended, the site would have become a more permanent residence. Points found here suggest that the culture is ancestral to that which created the Clovis points, of which variations can be found across North America.

See also
Upward Sun River site
Paleo-Arctic tradition

References

Archaeology of the United States
History of the United States
Archaeological cultures of North America
Clovis culture
Clovis sites
Hunter-gatherers of the United States
Pre-Columbian cultures
Archaeological sites in Alaska
Paleo-Indian archaeological sites in the United States
Tanana Athabaskans